St Patrick's GAA (Irish: CLG Naomh Pádraig) is a Gaelic Athletic Association  club based in County Limerick, Ireland. Founded in 1886, the club fields teams in Gaelic Football and in Hurling. It is based in the Rhebogue area in Limerick City.

Honours
 Limerick Senior Football Championship (5): 1890, 1891, 1943, 1944, 1954
 Limerick Senior Hurling Championship (2): 1949, 1950

Notable players
 Gearóid Hegarty

References

Gaelic games clubs in County Limerick
Hurling clubs in County Limerick